Ashley Lawrence or Laurence may refer to:

Ashley Lawrence (musician) (1934–1990), New Zealand conductor
Ashley Lawrence (soccer) (born 1995), Canadian soccer player
Ashley Laurence (born 1966), American actress